Emmanuel Vanluchene (born 9 December 1992) is a Belgian swimmer. He is competing for Belgium at the 2012 Summer Olympics.

References

Belgian male freestyle swimmers
Swimmers at the 2012 Summer Olympics
Swimmers at the 2016 Summer Olympics
Olympic swimmers of Belgium
1992 births
Living people